Birthony Katarina Nansen (born 11 January 1987), better known as Baby Nansen, is a New Zealand professional boxer and kickboxer. Nansen's biggest fight of her career was against Melissa St. Vil for the vacant WBC Silver female super featherweight title on the Kali Reis vs. Maricela Cornejo undercard. Despite losing the bout, she fought very well and received a WBC ranking of 39th. Nansen has fought on a King in the Ring undercard.

Vs Jennings
In 2016, Nansen was appointed as the number one contender for the New Zealand National (NZPBA Version) Super Featherweight Title, which was then held by Rebecca Jennings. The two fought each other in May 2017 for the NZPBA title with the winner originally being Nansen by Split Decision. Shortly after the bout, Nansen's camp was approached by the officiating supervisor and it was revealed the scorecard calculations were added up incorrectly. Nansen was stripped of the title immediately and the result was changed to a draw from the right calculations.

Madison Square Garden
In May 2018, Baby Nansen fought at the world-famous venue at Madison Square Garden. She took on undefeated boxer Mikaela Mayer who later in her career lead to winning the World title. Baby Nansen lost the fight by Unanimous Decision. Baby Nansen was the first New Zealand female boxer to have fought at the venue and the first New Zealander in 11 years since Kali Meehan fought DaVarryl Williamson.

Controversy
On 10 August 2021, Baby Nansen was in the corner for a fighter that she coached at her kickboxing gym. When her fight was lost by contentious points decision, Nansen confronted one of the judges, and then punched him. A week later, a video of the altercation was published by news media. Nansen apologised to the official and the sanctioning body, which accepted the apology after lengthy conversations and suspended her from its events for 12 months. Nansen also stepped down from her gym. City Kickboxing, the gym that Nansen trained at professionally, cancelled a bout she was to compete in and indefinitely suspended her. City Kickboxing took the action in light of the recent death of fighter Fau Vake, who trained at the gym and died after being on life support for over a week after being blindsided and receiving a coward punch outside a night club in Auckland.

Combat titles won

Kickboxing titles
 WMC New Zealand Featherweight Title
 ISKA South Pacific Featherweight Title
 WMC New Zealand Amateur Lightweight Title
 WMC New Zealand Amateur Featherweight Title
 WMC New Zealand Junior Amateur Lightweight Title

Boxing
 New Zealand National (PBCNZ version) Super Lightweight Title
 South Pacific (PBCNZ version) Super Lightweight Title

Professional boxing record

Awards and recognitions 
2019 Gladrap Boxing Awards Female boxer of the year (Nominated)
2019 Gladrap Boxing Awards Best looking female boxer of the year (Nominated)
2020 New Zealand Fighter Boxing Awards Knockout of the year (Won)

References

External links
Awakening Fighters Profile

1987 births
Living people
New Zealand sportspeople of Samoan descent
Sportspeople from Auckland
New Zealand women boxers
Lightweight boxers
Super-featherweight boxers
Featherweight boxers
New Zealand female kickboxers
Boxers from Auckland